Lucanus tetraodon is a stag beetle of the family Lucanidae.

Description
Similar to Lucanus cervus and Lucanus capreolus it is, with a length of 30–48 mm, a relatively large lucanid beetle of the genus Lucanus. The male has long, curved upper jaws, while female's ones are shorter.

Habitat
This species is diffused in Central and Southern Italy, Sicily, Sardinia, Corsica, Southern France, Albania, Greece and Algeria. It is diffused in the mesophilic woods and in the maquis shrubland.

Gallery

See also
Taxonomy of Lucanidae

References

External links

 Lucanus tetraodon (INPN)

teraodon
Beetles described in 1806
Beetles of North Africa
Beetles of Europe